Apostolepis serrana is a species of snake in the family Colubridae. It is endemic to Brazil.

References 

serrana
Reptiles described in 2006
Reptiles of Brazil